Samuel Aston Humphreys (born 3 November 1995) is an English footballer who last played for Banbury United.

He made his English Football League debut as a late substitute for Oxford United against Newport County in the last game of the 2014–15 season. His contract was cancelled in March 2016 as he joined Valdres, in the fourth tier of the Norwegian football league system, with fellow Oxford midfielder Aidan Hawtin. In August 2016 he returned to England, joining Hayes & Yeading United. He made the move to sign for Banbury United in November 2016.

Career statistics

References

External links
 
 Rage Online Profile
 

1995 births
Living people
People from Chipping Norton
Oxford United F.C. players
English Football League players
Hayes & Yeading United F.C. players
Banbury United F.C. players
Association football midfielders
English footballers
English expatriate footballers
English expatriate sportspeople in Norway